Plaza of the Americas may refer to:

Plaza of the Americas (Gainesville, Florida), University of Florida campus
Plaza of the Americas (Dallas), building complex in the City Center District, Dallas, Texas